Good agricultural practice (GAP) is a certification system for agriculture, specifying procedures (and attendant documentation) that must be implemented to create food for consumers or further processing that is safe and wholesome, using sustainable methods. While there are numerous competing definitions of what methods constitute good agricultural practice, there are several broadly accepted schemes that producers can adhere too.

Motivation

Introduction of GAP is particularly desirable when there is chronic overuse and misuse of agricultural pesticides. Governments seek to reduce the use of pesticides by promoting alternative methods of pest management, while at the same time ensuring a steady production of safe and wholesome food.

Organizations

Food and Agricultural Organization (FAO) of the United Nations GAP
The Food and Agricultural Organization of the United Nations (FAO) uses good agricultural practice as a collection of principles applying to on-farm production and post-production processes, resulting in safe and healthy food and non-food agricultural products, while taking into account economical, social and environmental sustainability.

GAPs require maintaining a common database on integrated production techniques for each of the major agro-ecological area (see ecoregion). They collect, analyze and disseminate information of good practices in relevant geographical contexts.

United States Department of Agriculture GAP/GHP Program
The United States Department of Agriculture Agricultural Marketing Service operates an audit/certification program to verify that farms use good agricultural practice or good handling practice. It is a voluntary program typically used by growers and packers to satisfy contractual requirements with retail and food service buyers. The program was implemented in 2002 after the New Jersey Department of Agriculture petitioned USDA-AMS to implement an audit-based program to verify conformance to the 1998 Food & Drug Administration publication entitled, "Guide to Minimize Microbial Food Safety Hazards for Fresh Fruits and Vegetables."

The program has been updated several times since 2002, and includes additional certification programs such as commodity specific audit programs for mushrooms, tomatoes, leafy greens, and cantaloupes. In 2009, USDA-AMS participated in the GAPs Harmonization Initiative which "harmonized" 14 of the major North American GAP audit standards, which in 2011 resulted in the release and implementation of the Produce GAPs Harmonized Food Safety Standard.

Recommendations

Soil

 Reducing erosion by wind and water through hedging and ditching.
 Application of fertilizers at appropriate moments and in adequate doses (i.e., when the plant needs the fertilizer), to avoid run-off
The use of sewage sludge is currently not allowed on GAP-certified farms of horticultural crops (though it is unclear whether this includes compost derived from sewage sludge and other human excreta derived fertilizers).
 Maintaining or restoring soil organic content, by manure application, use of grazing, crop rotation
 Reduce soil compaction issues (by avoiding using heavy mechanical devices)
 Maintain soil structure, by limiting heavy tillage practices
 In situ green manuring by growing pulse crops like cowpea, horse gram, sunn hemp etc.

Water

 Practice scheduled irrigation, with monitoring of plant needs, and soil water reserve status to avoid water loss by drainage
 Prevent soil salinization by limiting water input to needs, and recycling water whenever possible
 Avoid crops with high water requirements in a low availability region
 Avoid drainage and fertilizer run-off
 Maintain permanent soil covering, in particular in winter to avoid nitrogen run-off
 Manage carefully water table, by limiting heavy output of water
 Restore or maintain wetlands (see marshlands)
 Provide good water points for livestock
 Harvest water in situ by digging catch pits, crescent bunds across slope

Animal production, health and welfare

 Respect of animal well-being (freedom from hunger and thirst; freedom from discomfort; freedom from pain, injury or disease; freedom to express normal behavior; and freedom from fear and distress)
 Avoid nontherapeutic mutilations, surgical or invasive procedures, such as tail docking and debeaking;
 Avoid negative impacts on landscape, environment and life: contamination of land for grazing, food, water and air
 Check stocks and flows, maintain structure of systems
 Prevent chemical and medical residues from entering the food chain
 Minimize non-therapeutic use of antibiotics or hormones
 Avoid feeding animals with animal wastes or animal matter (reducing the risk of alien viral or transgenic genes, or prions such as mad cow disease),
 Minimize transport of live animals (by foot, rail or road) (reducing the risk of epidemics, e.g., foot and mouth disease)
 Prevent waste run-off (e.g. nitrate contamination of water tables from pigs), nutrient loss and greenhouse gas emissions (methane from cows)
 Prefer safety measures standards in manipulation of equipment
 Apply traceability processes on the whole production chain (breeding, feed, medical treatment...) for consumer security and feedback possibility in case of a food crisis (e.g., dioxin).

Healthcare and public health

 Quality assurance of the horticultural or agricultural production of medicinal plant

Smallholder productivity
Demand for agricultural crops is expected to double as the world's population reaches 9.1 billion by 2050.  Increasing the quantity and quality of food in response to growing demand will require increased agricultural production. Good agricultural practices, often in combination with effective input use, are one of the best ways to increase smallholder productivity.  Many agribusinesses are building sustainable supply chains to increase production and improve quality.

See also

 Best practice
 Biosecurity
 Electrical energy efficiency on United States farms
 EurepGAP
 Farm assurance
 GxP
 ISO 9000
 List of sustainable agriculture topics
 Urban agriculture

References

Further reading
  (Free download)

External links
 USDA GAP/GHP Program
 FDA-CFSAN Guide to Minimize Microbial Food Safety Hazards for Fresh Fruits and Vegetables
GLOBAL G.A.P. – The Worldwide Standard for Good Agricultural Practices 
 Working with Smallholders: A Handbook for Firms Working with Smallholders provides case studies on good agricultural practices

Sustainable agriculture
Agroecology
Good practice